S-Glutathionylation is the posttranslational modification of protein cysteine residues by the addition of glutathione, the most abundant and important low-molecular-mass thiol within most cell types.

Protein S-glutathionylation is involved in 
 oxidative stress
 nitrosative stress
 preventing irreversible oxidation of protein thiols
 control of cell-signalling pathways by modulating protein function

References

Post-translational modification